List of Toyo University people is a list article of people related to Toyo University.

University staff 
Masajuro Shiokawa, first President

Alumni 
Chafurin, voice actor
Kosuke Hagino, swimmer, Olympic gold medalist
Yasuo Ikenaka, marathon former world record holder
Suehiro Ishikawa, marathon runner
Hisanori Kitajima, marathon runner
Yoshihide Kiryū, sprinter
Ryōta Murata, boxer, Olympic gold medalist
Yui Ohashi, swimmer
Ango Sakaguchi, novelist
Maaya Sakamoto, actress, voice actress and essayist
Yuta Shitara, marathon runner
Hitoshi Ueki, actor, comedian
Masayasu Wakabayashi, comedian
Mitakeumi Hisashi, Sumo wrestler
Wakatakakage Atsushi, Sumo wrestler

Dropped out 
Masahiko Nishimura, actor
Hiromitsu Ochiai, Chunichi Dragons supervisor
Chishū Ryū, actor

Toyo University